Fellows of the Royal Society elected in 1947.

Fellows 

William Joscelyn Arkell
Clement Attlee
George Macdonald Bennett
William Sawney Bisat
Dame Mary Lucy Cartwright
Edward Joseph Conway
Thomas George Cowling
James Craigie
Morley Benjamin Crane
William Jolly Duncan
Meredith Gwynne Evans
Wilhelm Siegmund Feldberg
Tom Goodey
Dorothy Mary Crowfoot Hodgkin
John Hutchinson
Derek Jackson
Sir Geoffrey Jefferson
 Sir Hans Adolf Krebs
Frederick George Mann
Philip Burton Moon
Egon Orowan
Friedrich Adolf Paneth
Muriel Robertson
Frederick John Marrian Stratton
Conrad Hal Waddington
 Sir Frank Whittle

Foreign members

Élie Joseph Cartan
Paul Karrer
Harold Clayton Urey
Ojvind Winge

Royal Fellow (later Patron)
 Elizabeth II

References

1947
1947 in science
1947 in the United Kingdom